The Ring magazine was established in 1922 and has named a Prospect of the Year since 1983. The award is given to a boxer who has the most potential to become a future star in the sport, as based on the magazine's writers' criteria. In 1989 the award was discontinued, but was reinstated in 2011.

1983 Kenny Baysmore
1984 Mark Breland
1985 Mike Tyson
1986 Mike Williams
1987 Engels Pedroza
1988 Michael Moorer
2011 Gary Russell Jr.
2012 Keith Thurman
2013 Vasyl Lomachenko
2014 Anthony Joshua
2015 Takuma Inoue
2016 Erickson Lubin 
2017 Jaime Munguia
2018 Teófimo López
2019 Vergil Ortiz Jr.
2020 Jaron Ennis
2021 Brandun Lee
2022 Keyshawn Davis

References

External links

Awards disestablished in 1989
Awards established in 1983
Boxing awards
Prospect of the year